3A is a German pop band consisting of brothers Aaron, Abel, and Adam Lovac.

Band history 
The Lovac brothers were discovered in Nieukerk, Germany, when they were between the ages of only 11 to 13 years old. In 2010, they published their first album titled Teenage Queen. This led to their discovery by German producer Peter Hoffmann and a record deal with the major label Sony Music. At first, the band was known as LaLaLa, however they changed their name to 3A before the publication of their next album, #wirsindhier. In 2013 they were included in the opening act for Tyler Ward's 11 concerts in Germany. In February 2014, the band released their first single, Sind Wir Freunde?, which reached 81 on the German singles chart. Their album #wirsindhier appeared with some delay in April of that year and also reached the 85th spot on the chart.

In May 2016 Lina Larissa Strahl published her album Official, as a part of which band member Aaron Lovac accompanies Strahl for the song Mädchen liebt das Feuer.

Band members
 Aaron Lovac, Singer and Drummer
 Abel Lovac, Singer and Guitarist
 Adam Lovac, Singer and Bassist

Discography 
Albums

 Teenage Queen (2010)
 #wirsindhier (2014)

Songs

 Sind wir Freunde? (2014)
 Parallel (2014)

References 

German pop music groups
German boy bands